BWF may refer to:

Sports organisations

Badminton
 Badminton World Federation, an international governing body for badminton

Professional wrestling
 Brazilian Wrestling Federation, a Brazilian Professional wrestling promotion.
 British Wrestling Federation, a 1960s alliance of independent UK professional wrestling promotions led by Paul Lincoln
 British Wrestling Federation, a 1980s/1990s UK professional wrestling promotion owned by Orig Williams

Other
 Barrow/Walney Island Airfield IATA airport code 
 Biblical Witness Fellowship, an evangelical renewal movement
 Broadcast Wave Format, an extension of the popular WAV audio format
 Burroughs Wellcome Fund

pt:Brazilian Wrestling Federation